Tetanolita hermes is a litter moth of the family Erebidae first described by William Schaus in 1916. It is found in Paraguay.

References

Herminiinae
Moths described in 1916